The following is a list of geomagnetic reversals, showing the ages of the beginning and end of each period of normal polarity (where the polarity matches the current direction).  

Source for the last 83 million years: Cande and Kent, 1995.

Ages are in million years before present (mya).

References

Geochronology
Paleomagnetism
Geomagnetic reversal